The Bemidji State Beavers attempted to qualify for the NCAA Tournament for the first time in school history.

Recruiting

Exhibition

Regular season
October 16: Alana McElhinney made a career-high 56 saves. In the game, Bemidji State had its first-ever win over a No. 1-ranked team as they defeated the Mercyhurst Lakers by a 5-3 mark. In addition, this was the second women's game ever played at the new Bemidji Regional Event Center.
October 29–30: Erin Cody had the biggest weekend of her collegiate career. She was involved in all seven of the Bemidji State’s goals, as the Beavers swept St. Cloud State. Cody had five goals and two assists, and was a factor in both game-winning goals. Cody earned the First Star of the Game honors in both games. In the first game, Cody scored a natural hat trick (a power-play, shorthanded, and even-strength goal). All three goals were scored in the first period and set a Beavers record for most goals scored by a single player in one period. In the second game, Cody had two goals and two assists.
Jan. 15-16: Team captain Annie Bauerfield had a hand in each of the four goals the Beavers scored in losses to WCHA rival University of North Dakota.
Jan. 22: The Beavers defeated Minnesota State 3-1 to complete the weekend sweep over the Mavericks. Bemidji State extended its unbeaten streak against MSU and allowed only one goal on the weekend. The Beavers are now 7-0-3 in the last ten meetings with the Mavericks.

Standings

Schedule

Conference record

Postseason
February 26: Zuzana Tomcikova picked up her 14th career shutout and sixth of the season, breaking her previous record for most shutouts in a single season.
February 27: Versus the No. 8 ranked North Dakota Fighting Sioux, the Beavers lost the game 16 minutes into overtime at Purpur Arena. With the loss, North Dakota won the first-round of WCHA playoffs.

Awards and honors
Annie Bauerfeld, Beaver Pride Athletes of the Week (Week of Jan. 10-16)
Erin Cody, WCHA Offensive Player of the Week (Week of November 3, 2010)
Alana McElhinney, WCHA Defensive Player of the Week (Week of October 19)
Zuzana Tomcikova, WCHA Defensive Player of the Week (Week of October 5)
Zuzana Tomcikova, 2011 All-WCHA Second Team

See also
2009–10 Bemidji State Beavers women's ice hockey season

References

Bemidji State Beavers women's ice hockey seasons
Bemidji State
Bemidji